Thein Zaw (born 5 May 1994) is a footballer from Burma, and a defender for Myanmar national football team.

Club career
He currently plays for Zwekapin United in Myanmar National League, and formally played for Ayeyawady United.
In 2015 December, Thein Zaw moved to Yangon United.

International career
Thein Zaw made his debut on 19 May 2014 in the AFC Challenge Cup against the host Maldives. In the match Thein Zaw was controversially sent off in the 22 minute by referee Abdullah Balideh for alleged handball, a charge fervently denied by Myanmar's coach Radojko Avramović, as the ball seemed to bounce off his chest rather than his arm.

References

1994 births
Living people
Burmese footballers
Myanmar international footballers
Ayeyawady United F.C. players
Yangon United F.C. players
Association football defendersthein